Robert Budd Dwyer (November 21, 1939 – January 22, 1987) was an American politician. He served from 1965 to 1971 as a Republican member of the Pennsylvania House of Representatives and from 1971 to 1981 as a member of the Pennsylvania State Senate representing the state's 50th district. Dwyer then served as the 30th state treasurer of Pennsylvania from January 20, 1981, to January 22, 1987, when he killed himself during a live press conference.

In the early 1980s, Pennsylvania discovered that its state workers had overpaid federal taxes due to errors in state withholding prior to Dwyer's administration. A multi-million-dollar recovery contract was required to determine the compensation to be given to each employee. In 1986, Dwyer was convicted of accepting a bribe from Computer Technology Associates (CTA) to award them the contract. He was found guilty on 11 counts of conspiracy, mail fraud, perjury, and interstate transportation in aid of racketeering, and was scheduled to be sentenced on January 23, 1987. On January 22, Dwyer called a news conference in the Pennsylvania State Capitol Building in Harrisburg, during which he fatally shot himself with a .357 Magnum revolver in front of reporters. Dwyer's suicide was broadcast later that day to a wide television audience across Pennsylvania.

All posthumous appeals made by Dwyer's lawyers on Dwyer's behalf were denied, and his convictions were upheld. Along with Barbara Hafer and Rob McCord, Dwyer is one of three former Pennsylvania State treasurers to be convicted of corruption since the 1980s.

Early life and education
R. Budd Dwyer was born on November 21, 1939, in St. Charles, Missouri. He graduated in 1961 with an A.B. in Political Science and Accounting from Allegheny College in Meadville, Pennsylvania, where he was a member of the Beta Chi chapter of Theta Chi Fraternity. After earning a master's degree in education in 1963, he taught social studies and coached football at Cambridge Springs High School.

Career

A Republican, Dwyer became active in politics. He was elected to the Pennsylvania House of Representatives from the 6th district (although seats were apportioned by county before 1969) in 1964 and was reelected in 1966 and 1968. In 1970, while still a sitting State Representative, Dwyer ran for a seat in the Pennsylvania State Senate from its 50th district and won. Shortly after his victory he resigned his seat in the State House and was sworn in as Senator in January 1971.

After being elected to additional terms in 1974 and 1978, Dwyer decided to try for a statewide office and in 1980 ran for and won the office of Pennsylvania Treasurer that had been held by Robert E. Casey since 1976. He ran for a second and last term in 1984 and won reelection to the seat, defeating Democratic nominee and former auditor general Al Benedict.

Bribery investigation and conviction
From 1979 to 1981, before Dwyer was state treasurer, public employees of the Commonwealth of Pennsylvania overpaid millions of dollars in Federal Insurance Contributions Act taxes (FICA). As a result, the state required an accounting firm to determine refunds for its employees. Dwyer awarded the no-bid $4.6 million contract to Computer Technology Associates (CTA), a California-based firm, owned by John Torquato Jr., a native of Harrisburg, Pennsylvania, on May 10, 1984.

In early 1984, Dennis Schatzman, deputy comptroller of Pittsburgh Public Schools, noticed financial discrepancies in the CTA contract, and wrote to Pittsburgh school officials regarding these. Schatzman later contacted officials at the accounting firm Arthur Young and Associates, who confirmed that the no-bid CTA contract was overpriced by millions of dollars. In June 1984 the Office of the Pennsylvania Auditor General informed the Federal Bureau of Investigation (FBI) of the alleged bribery that occurred during the awarding of the contract. In late July 1984, Janice R. Kincaid, a former CTA employee, released a sworn statement claiming that Dwyer awarded the contract to CTA because he was promised a $300,000 kickback by the company.

An investigation into Dwyer's awarding of the CTA contract was undertaken by federal prosecutors. Upon learning of this investigation, Dwyer rescinded the contract with CTA on July 11, 1984. Subsequently, Dwyer repeatedly attempted to stop, divert and forestall the investigation, stating that the U.S. attorney had neither the authority nor evidence to pursue prosecution. Dwyer later admitted to telling his staff to withhold request for proposal (RFP) information from the U.S. attorney and the FBI during the investigation. After being indicted by a federal grand jury, Dwyer was finally charged with agreeing to receive a kickback of $300,000 in return for awarding CTA the contract.

Dwyer stated that he offered to take a polygraph exam but only on the condition that if he passed it, he would not be indicted. The state rejected Dwyer's offer. Prior to Dwyer's indictment, on October 22, 1984, a grand jury indicted Torquato, Torquato's attorney William T. Smith, Judy Smith, Alan R. Stoneman, and David Herbert. At Smith's 1985 trial, Smith, who was a friend of Dwyer's, testified that he did not bribe Dwyer, and instead that Torquato offered Dwyer a campaign contribution in return for the CTA contract, yet Dwyer rejected Torquato's offer. In contrast, Torquato testified that Smith offered Dwyer a $300,000 bribe in return for the CTA contract. Dwyer, acting as a defense witness for Smith at Smith's trial, denied that he was offered any contribution at all. In August 1984, Smith failed a polygraph exam when he stated that he did not bribe Dwyer or any state official. However, prior to Smith's trial, on October 27, 1984 (four days after Smith's indictment), Smith confessed to offering Dwyer a bribe, and stated that Dwyer accepted this offer.

However, Bob Asher, the then Pennsylvania Republican Party Chairman, objected to this, and requested that the $300,000 be directed entirely to the Republican State Committee, since Asher "did not want Dwyer to go to jail".

Dwyer, along with Asher, were indicted by a federal grand jury on May 13, 1986. In the hopes of reducing his twelve-year sentence stemming from his 1985 conviction, Smith testified on behalf of the federal government against Dwyer and Asher at their 1986 trial. Ultimately, Smith did not receive any reduction in his sentence for testifying against Dwyer (although his wife, Judy Smith, was granted immunity from prosecution). Before testifying against Dwyer, Smith passed a polygraph exam.

It was revealed at Dwyer's trial that he sought and won approval for special legislation—Act 38 of 1984 (House Bill 1397)—that authorized him to recover the FICA overpayments, and that coded computer tape seized from CTA's office on July 6, 1984, showed that Dwyer was to receive a $300,000 pay-off for awarding CTA the contract. Moreover, Smith and Torquato's claims about Dwyer being bribed were corroborated by four independent and impartial witnesses, and Smith's testimony against Dwyer was virtually identical to written statements Smith made long before entering into a plea agreement. Additionally, FBI agents testified that Dwyer attempted to conceal his involvement in the scheme when, after learning of the FBI investigation, he erased the entry in his appointment book of the March 2, 1984, meeting with Torquato and Smith in which he was first offered a bribe. Dwyer maintained that he awarded CTA the contract on the basis of his treasury task force recommendation, yet this conflicted with the fact that Dwyer personally handled all matters relating to the contract six days prior to awarding it to CTA. Furthermore, his task force's contribution merely consisted in the making of a single phone call to David I. Herbert (the former State Director for Social Security, who controlled FICA recovery for Pennsylvania's public employees, and who was subsequently convicted for conspiring with CTA).

Dwyer awarded the contract to CTA—an obscure California firm with three employees, little equipment, and little experience—despite being informed in April 1984 by the major Pennsylvania-based accounting firm Arthur Young and Associates (who had two hundred and fifty employees and submitted a proposal on April 13, 1984, at least fourteen days prior to CTA's proposal) that they could perform the FICA recovery as fast as CTA for half the cost.
Charles Collins, Arthur Young's former director of management consulting in Pittsburgh, testified at Dwyer's trial that Arthur Young and Associates, who, unlike CTA, had experience in identical tax recovery work, was prepared to negotiate the FICA recovery contract (that was half the cost of the CTA contract) and that Dwyer was clearly aware of Arthur Young's position before committing the contract to CTA. Additionally, sixteen other competitors were willing to be considered for the FICA recovery contract and many had communicated with Treasurer Dwyer's office to request an opportunity to bid on the contract, yet Dwyer did not respond. Dwyer repeatedly stated that he awarded the contract to CTA (via his task force's recommendation) on the basis of CTA's providing "immediate credit", yet the contract between CTA and Dwyer contained no information regarding CTA's ability to provide such credit. Moreover, Dwyer admitted that he did not mention the concept of "immediate credit" to Arthur Young and Associates when officials from the firm asked why CTA was chosen over them. In contradiction to Dwyer's statements about awarding CTA the contract on the basis of their providing "immediate credit", Arthur Young and Associates were told that CTA got the contract since they first recognized that the overpayments could be recovered, and that they supported legislation that gave Dwyer the sole power to award said contract.

Nevertheless, Dwyer denied any wrongdoing, stating that after the CTA contract was signed, Smith merely made a "generic" offer to help him with his campaign. Dwyer's lawyer spoke to the prosecutor, acting U.S. Attorney James West, asking him if he would drop all charges against Dwyer if Dwyer resigned as state treasurer. West declined the offer. He instead offered to let Dwyer plead guilty to a single charge of bribe receiving, which would have meant up to a maximum of five years' imprisonment, as long as he resigned from his office as Treasurer of Pennsylvania and cooperated fully with the government's investigation, but Dwyer refused and went to trial. At his trial, Dwyer did not take the stand, and his lawyer, Paul Killion, presented no defense witnesses since he thought that the government did not sufficiently prove its case. It is possible that Dwyer did not testify in his own defense since he did not want to be questioned regarding his involvement in a 1980 conspiracy involving his wife's business "Poli-Ed," and two Pennsylvania State Education Association (PSEA) employees. One of these employees was Dwyer's close friend and campaign manager Fred Mckillop, who was subsequently fired by the PSEA for his involvement in the scheme, and who later featured in a 2010 documentary about Dwyer. In this conspiracy, which was investigated by the office of the Pennsylvania Attorney General, Dwyer allegedly siphoned money from his campaign into his personal funds.

On December 18, 1986, Dwyer was found guilty on 11 counts of conspiracy, mail fraud, perjury and interstate transportation in aid of racketeering, and consequently faced a sentence of up to 55 years imprisonment and a $300,000 fine. His sentencing was scheduled for January 23, 1987, to be performed by U.S. District Court Judge Malcolm Muir. One mail-fraud charge against Dwyer was dismissed by Judge Muir. One juror, Carolyn Edwards of Williamsport, found it emotionally difficult to convict Dwyer (and Asher) since they were men of "very high integrity ... they just made a mistake". Bob Asher, Dwyer's co-defendant, was sentenced to one year in jail. He later returned to politics and served as a Republican national committeeman for Pennsylvania.

Accounting firm Levin-Horwath ultimately fulfilled the contract for $1,300,000, with slightly over a third of the fee possibly being subject to rebate. If CTA were to have performed the recovery work, Pennsylvania would have lost $6,000,000.

Dwyer's status as state treasurer
Pennsylvania law stated that Dwyer could not officially be removed from office until his sentencing in January. Given this, Dwyer stated that until his legal appeal was resolved, he would stay on as treasurer under leave of absence without pay and would not resign before having the opportunity to appeal his conviction. In the interim, the treasury department would be run by Deputy Treasurer Donald L. Johnson.

Dwyer continued to profess his innocence after being convicted, and on December 23 wrote a letter to President Ronald Reagan seeking a presidential pardon, and to Senator Arlen Specter seeking support in this effort.

The week of Dwyer's sentencing, Pennsylvania State Attorney General LeRoy Zimmerman and state prosecutors were investigating a provision of the Pennsylvania state constitution where removal of a civil worker from office who has been convicted of a crime is "self-executing", thus, automatic upon that person's sentencing. A decision confirming this constitutional point was expected on January 22, the day before Dwyer's sentencing hearing.

Public suicide
In a meeting in his home on January 15, 1987, Dwyer discussed the idea of a press conference with his press secretary James "Duke" Horshock and Deputy Treasurer Don Johnson. At the meeting, both Horshock and Johnson cautioned Dwyer not to use the conference to attack the governor or other individuals involved with his criminal conviction, and both suggested to Dwyer that he should hold the conference at a location other than his office. Dwyer angrily rejected their suggestion, but nevertheless assured both men that he would not attack anybody involved with his conviction. He additionally stated that he would not announce his resignation at the conference, but rather thank his staff and friends. Nevertheless, both men left assuming Dwyer would ultimately resign at the conference, although Horshock had fears that Dwyer would break his promise.

The next day Dwyer visited his lawyer, Paul Killion, who told Dwyer to express repentance for his crimes. Dwyer responded by agreeing to change his "version of events" which was to be presented to Judge Muir at Dwyer's pre-sentencing conference scheduled for the afternoon of January 22. Dwyer later saw Killion again, gave him an updated "version of events", and stated that he would announce his resignation at the press conference, yet did not want Killion to attend the conference.

Dwyer finally reached Senator Specter by telephone on January 21, two days before his sentencing. A Specter aide stated that the two of them talked for eight to ten minutes. Following up on his letter to the senator asking for help, he personally wrote to President Ronald Reagan asking for a presidential pardon. In his letter, Dwyer once again professed his innocence and stated that the concept of immediate credit was not understood by the uneducated, unsophisticated "rural" jury at his trial. The senator responded that this request to President Reagan was "not realistic" because the judicial process, including appeals, had not yet run its course.

On the same day, Dwyer asked his press secretary Horshock and deputy press secretary Gregory Penny to set up a news conference for the next day without telling them what he was to discuss. Horshock arranged the press conference for 10:30 a.m. EST the next day, January 22. The press secretary called dozens of reporters asking them to attend, and told them he did not know its subject.

Initially, Dwyer wanted to ban certain reporters from the press conference who he believed wrote biased accounts about him and even suggested that a guard should be in attendance to prevent entry to those who were not on his authorized list. Horshock, who was unconvinced about Dwyer's claims that he was being conspired against, objected, stating to Dwyer that he could not "use state government facilities to manipulate the free flow of information".

Leading up to the press conference, acting U.S. Attorney West, who had secured the conviction against Dwyer, remarked that the Treasurer's (supposed) resignation "sounds like the appropriate thing to do under the circumstances. It seems like it would save everybody a lot of time and aggravation." Similarly, Harrisburg Patriot-News reporter Kenn Marshall described the consensus among reporters: they would be attending to see Dwyer announce his resignation from his office. "My mission was to stay there until he said those words, then call in a new top for our story."

The night before the press conference, Dwyer wrote the following note:

Dwyer's press statement
The next morning, Dwyer went to his press conference as planned. Standing behind a large wood table that separated him from nine television cameras, four wire service photographers and about 20 television, radio and newspaper reporters, he began reading from a 21-page prepared text, while aides handed a 20-page version to the media. The final page was expected to be his announcement that he would resign from office.

Appearing nervous and agitated, Dwyer again professed his innocence and accused acting U.S. Attorney James West, FBI agents, U.S. District Court Judge Malcolm Muir, the media and others for tarnishing the justice system and ruining him. Dwyer stated that Attorney West purposely held Dwyer's trial not in Harrisburg but in Williamsport, due to it being located in Lycoming County, one of the most uneducated counties in Pennsylvania. Dwyer spoke out against the death penalty and expressed regret for voting in favor of it while he was in the Pennsylvania assembly. This speech lasted nearly 30 minutes, and approximately halfway into it, with no apparent end in sight, some of the gathered press began to pack up and leave. Dwyer spotted this and interrupted himself to say, "Those of you who are putting your cameras away, I think you ought to stay because we're not, we're not finished yet."

Given the sensitive nature of portions of Dwyer's text, press secretary Horshock had considered interrupting him outright to stop him but concluded that he would hold his own press conference after Dwyer's. "I had to make it known that I was not aware of the content of the statement. I didn't want it to be thought that I wrote that for him."

Upon reaching the final page of his statement, which had not been distributed to the press nor press secretary Horshock in advance, Dwyer paused. "... and I'm on the last page now, and I don't have enough to pass out, but Duke [Horshock], I'll leave this here, and you can make copies for the people; there's a few extra copies here right now." Dwyer continued,

At this point, Dwyer stopped reading from his prepared remarks, with the gathered press still waiting on his expected resignation. There was still a significant portion of the prepared text remaining, which detailed what he was actually planning to do, and it read as follows (he did not read these comments to the crowd):

After deciding to break from his speech, Dwyer called to three of his staffers, giving each a sealed envelope with the insignia of the treasury department. The first envelope, given to Bob Holste, contained a letter addressed to then-Pennsylvania Governor Bob Casey, who had taken office just two days earlier. The second, given to deputy press secretary Gregory Penny, contained an organ donor card and other related materials. The last, given to Deputy Treasurer Don Johnson, contained materials intended for Dwyer's family, including three letters: one for his wife Joanne, and one for each of his children, Rob and DeeDee (Dyan), and suggested funeral arrangements.

Freelance photographer Gary Miller, one of the reporters in attendance, described the scene at this point, stating: "It was just kind of a long-winded, sad event."

Suicide

After he had finished speaking and handing out the notes to his staffers, Dwyer then produced a manila envelope with a Model 19 .357 Magnum revolver in it. When the crowd in the room saw what Dwyer had pulled out of the envelope, the mood changed immediately from one of waiting to see whether he would resign his office to one of panic.

Reporters David Morris of the Associated Press, Thom Cole of UPI and Gary Warner of afternoon newspaper The Pittsburgh Press were at the rear of the room, waiting for Dwyer to say he had resigned, so they could run down the hall to telephones to tell their editors they could publish pre-written stories and add Dwyer's direct quote. When Dwyer produced the gun, the three ran into the hallway and shouted to a state police kiosk in the center of the long hallway that the treasurer had a gun.

Inside the room, people gasped, and Dwyer backed up against the wall, holding the weapon close to his body. Dwyer calmly said, "Please, please leave the room if this will ... if this will affect you."

Among those who stayed, some pleaded with Dwyer to surrender the gun while others tried to approach him and seize the weapon. Dwyer warned against either action, exclaiming his last words, "Don't, don't, don't, this will hurt someone."

Dwyer quickly put the muzzle of the gun in his mouth and pulled the trigger, firing a shot through the roof of his mouth and into his brain. He collapsed on the floor, dead. Blood ran out through the back of his head and through his nose.

Nine news cameras recorded the events. One of the cameras remained focused on Dwyer and captured close-up footage of the aftermath of the shooting; as his body slumped, blood streamed from the exit wound in the back of his head as well as from his nostrils and mouth. He died instantly from the gunshot shortly before 11:00 a.m. EST but was not pronounced dead until 11:31 a.m. An aide later stated that Dwyer's corneas were made available for transplant per his organ donation wishes, but that no other organs were usable by the time his body reached a hospital. Interment took place at Blooming Valley Cemetery in Saegertown on January 26.

Graphic footage and television media
Many television stations throughout Pennsylvania broadcast taped footage of Dwyer's suicide to a midday audience. Philadelphia station WPVI (Channel 6) showed Dwyer pulling the trigger and falling backwards, but did not show the bullet path. Over the next several hours, news editors had to decide how much of the graphic footage they wanted to air. Many chose not to air the final moments of the suicide and WPVI also chose not to show the gunshot a second time.

Many stations, including WCAU and Pennsylvania's Group W stations KYW and KDKA, froze the action just before the gunshot. However, the latter two allowed the audio of the shooting to continue under the frozen image. Group W's news cameraman William L. "Bill" Martin and reporter David Sollenberger had a camera set up at the conference. They chose to air the audio with a freeze-frame of the gun in Dwyer's mouth. Only a handful aired the unedited press conference. WPVI in Philadelphia re-broadcast the suicide footage in full on their 5 p.m. and 6 p.m. Action News broadcast without warning the viewers. That station's broadcast is a source for copies circulating on the Internet. WPXI in Pittsburgh is reported by the Associated Press to have broadcast the footage uncensored on an early newscast. In explaining the decision to air, WPXI operations manager By Williams said, "It's an important event [about] an important man." Williams avoided airing the footage in the evening newscasts, explaining, "Everyone knows by then that he did it. There are children out of school." However, in central Pennsylvania, many children were home from school during the day of Dwyer's suicide due to a snowstorm.

Many older students reacted to the event by creating black comedy jokes. A study of the incidence of the jokes showed that they were told only in areas where stations showed uncensored footage of the press conference. At least one reporter present at Dwyer's suicide suffered from being a witness. Tony Romeo, a radio reporter, was standing a few feet from Dwyer. After the suicide, Romeo developed depression and took a break from journalism.

Letter to Governor Bob Casey
Dwyer's deep mistrust of outgoing Republican Governor Dick Thornburgh was spelled out in detail in his press conference statement. The timing of Dwyer's press conference and suicide meant that Thornburgh was not empowered to appoint a Treasurer to replace him. Instead, this fell to Thornburgh's successor, Democrat Bob Casey, who had taken office on January 20.

The letter Dwyer had sent to Casey stated, among other things, "By the time you receive this letter ... the office of State Treasurer of Pennsylvania will be vacant. I stress to you that I did not resign but was State Treasurer of Pennsylvania to the end." It also stated that Casey "will be the great Governor that Pennsylvania needs at this time in our history." He suggested his wife Joanne as his successor, describing her as "very talented, personable, organized and hard-working."

Governor Casey did not take Dwyer's suggestion. Regardless of the events of January 22, the governor and legislature of Pennsylvania already expected Dwyer to either resign or be removed from office. As such, a deal had already been brokered wherein the next treasurer, a Democrat, would serve out Dwyer's term and step down at its end. This was G. Davis Greene Jr., who was appointed as the 31st Treasurer of Pennsylvania on January 23, 1987, the day after Dwyer's suicide.

Response to allegations made by Dwyer in his final press statement

In 2010, former U.S. attorney James West, who prosecuted Dwyer, affirmed Dwyer's guilt, stating that "the evidence against Dwyer was overwhelming and indisputable".

In his final press statement, Dwyer alleged that Governor Thornburgh along with prosecutor James West, engaged in a political vendetta against him, and that FBI agents had acted improperly in their investigation. Following Dwyer's public suicide, the National Association of State Treasurers called for Dwyer's allegations to be reviewed by the Department of Justice. After a thorough investigation, the Justice Department's Office of Professional Responsibility cleared attorney James West and everyone else involved in Dwyer's investigation and prosecution of any wrongdoing. The FBI also investigated Dwyer's claims regarding impropriety on behalf of FBI personnel. They ultimately found Dwyer's claims to be "lacking in substance and specificity" and warranting no further action. R.B. Swift, former Capitol reporter, noted that Dwyer's allegations were extensively investigated by journalists from both The Philadelphia Inquirer and the Associated Press, but no evidence was found to substantiate them.

Dwyer claimed that Governor Thornburgh sought revenge against him, since Dwyer had angered Thornburgh when he publicly refused to approve expense vouchers for Thornburgh's wife for a European trip, and, additionally, when he criticized Thornburgh's use of state police to chauffeur his son to school. In response, Thornburgh pointed out that prior to their European trip, the Thornburgh family had issued a press release specifically stating that Ginny Thornburgh would pay her own expenses. Upon their return to Pennsylvania, Mrs. Thornburgh "repeatedly requested" the Thornburgh staff to "advise her of the amount" to be reimbursed; however, Dwyer leaked this matter to The Philadelphia Inquirer in an attempt to "enhance his own image by embarrassing" Thornburgh and his family. Regarding the use of the state police, Thornburgh stated that “the security detail provided its services to all members of our household as the officers deemed necessary for our protection. We neither asked for nor questioned these services, which were no different than those provided to our predecessors.” Thornburgh spokesman David Runkel dismissed Dwyer's allegations (as being "paranoic"), as did John Taylor, the former spokesman for Governor Bob Casey. Pennsylvanian journalist and author Brad Bumsted suggested that Dwyer's allegations against Thornburgh may have been an attempt to divert attention from his own criminal activity with CTA. Bumsted also stated that, in Dwyer's final press statement, Dwyer "offered no real evidence" that there was any conspiracy against him.

Dwyer's deputy press secretary Gregory Penny, who was handed an envelope by Dwyer at Dwyer's final press conference, stated that he was convinced that Dwyer, who he had once defended, had been guilty all along:

Death benefits
If Dwyer had been sentenced, state law would have prohibited the payment of his state-provided pension benefits. A spokesman for Dwyer suggested that he may have killed himself to preserve the pension benefits for his family, whose finances had been ruined by legal defense costs. Other statements made by some friends and family also suggest that this was Dwyer's motivation.

However, at a panel discussion for the documentary Honest Man: The Life of R. Budd Dwyer,  Dwyer's sister Mary Kun stated that Dwyer had made the decision to kill himself prior to knowing he would lose his pension and thus his motivation for his suicide was not to provide financial support to his family, but rather to "sacrifice himself to help the system."

Appeals
On January 27, 1987, Dwyer's lawyers filed an appeal in the U.S. District Court for the Middle District of Pennsylvania seeking the dismissal of all post-trial motions that were then pending against Dwyer, abatement of Dwyer's conviction and the dismissal of his May 13, 1986, indictment. On March 5, 1987, the district court denied all motions, stating that "there were no grounds whatsoever upon which Mr. Dwyer could hope to succeed upon appeal" and ordered to "close this file as to R. Budd Dwyer". Dwyer's lawyers appealed this decision, and The US Court of Appeals for the Third Circuit subsequently vacated the judgment. On remand, the district court was instructed to dismiss Dwyer's motions (since the Court lacked subject matter jurisdiction), and Dwyer's convictions for mail fraud and conspiracy were upheld. Six years after Dwyer's death, efforts were made to clear Dwyer's name when a retrial request was filed in U.S. District Court in July 1993. This request was denied in October of the same year.

In popular culture

Music
 Cabaret Voltaire's 1987 song "Don't Argue" from the album Code samples audio of Dwyer's suicide.
 The 1988 Rapeman EP Budd is named after Dwyer, and its first track, which shares the EP's name, contains lyrics referencing his suicide.
 Faith No More's 1992 Angel Dust B-side "The World Is Yours" samples audio of Dwyer's suicide.
 German metal band Kreator used audio samples from the suicide of Dwyer in their song "Karmic Wheel" on their 1992 album Renewal.
 Marilyn Manson's debut single "Get Your Gunn" (1994) samples audio of Dwyer's suicide.
 The 1994 reissue of Neurosis's album Pain of Mind shows Dwyer on its cover moments before shooting himself.
Industrial metal band Dead World sampled the audio of Dwyer's suicide for their 1994 song and EP "This Will Hurt Someone".
 Some bootlegs of the Broken short film by Nine Inch Nails featured footage of Dwyer's suicide.
 The 1995 song "Hey Man Nice Shot" by rock band Filter is about Dwyer's suicide.
 The 1999 album Volume 1 by Pennsylvania rock band CKY initially featured an artistic depiction of Dwyer committing suicide. When the band later signed with Volcom, the album art was changed as the label found the graphic to be too offensive.
 In 2003, the band Ion Dissonance featured a song called "The Bud Dwyer Effect" on their album Breathing Is Irrelevant.
 In 2004, the rapper Necro sampled the audio of Dwyer's suicide in his song "You Did It", on his third studio album, The Pre-Fix for Death.
 On their 2013 album Hellbound, deathcore band Fit for an Autopsy paid homage to Dwyer in their song "Thank You, Budd Dwyer". The band stated that the song was in response to the injustices in the legal system and maintained that Dwyer was a victim of wrongful accusations.
 Suicideboys member $crim often uses the alias Budd Dwyer when producing. Also Suicideboys' 2014 EP, Kill Yourself Part III: The Budd Dwyer Saga, features a still frame of Dwyer excerpted from the moments before his suicide for the cover art.
 Emergency Broadcast Network used footage of Dwyer's suicide in the video for the 1992 track "Get Down, Get Down".
 Burger Child's album titled "You Can't Do That On Television" features a frame of Dwyer prior to the suicide, with the first song being "Buddpilled" and samples audio of Dwyer's suicide.

Film
 The 1992 film Phallus in Wonderland by shock rock band Gwar features a news reporter character named Dick Cox who commits suicide in the same manner as Dwyer, complete with offscreen pleas.
 The 1993 gore film Traces of Death made by Brain Damage Films includes full footage of Dwyer's Suicide at the last segment of the film.
 The 2002 documentary film Bowling for Columbine includes footage of Dwyer's suicide as part of a montage of gun-related video clips.
 The 2006 film Loren Cass shows footage of Dwyer's suicide.
 The 2010 documentary Honest Man: The Life of R. Budd Dwyer by director James Dirschberger detailed the events of the CTA scandal that led to Dwyer's suicide.

References

Further reading

External links

 

 
1939 births
1987 deaths
1987 suicides
Allegheny College alumni
American politicians who committed suicide
Burials in Pennsylvania
Filmed deaths in the United States
Filmed suicides
Republican Party members of the Pennsylvania House of Representatives
Republican Party Pennsylvania state senators
Politicians from Harrisburg, Pennsylvania
People from Meadville, Pennsylvania
People from St. Charles, Missouri
Pennsylvania politicians convicted of corruption
Politicians convicted of mail and wire fraud
Politicians convicted of racketeering
State treasurers of Pennsylvania
Suicides by firearm in Pennsylvania
Pennsylvania politicians convicted of crimes
20th-century American politicians
Organ transplant donors
Television controversies in the United States